The Oakham Farm is a historic farm at 23226 Oakham Farm Lane, near Middleburg in Loudoun County, Virginia.  The farm includes  of land north of United States Route 50, with its building complex anchored by a farmhouse built in 1847 and repeatedly altered.  The main portion of the farmhouse is a 1920s three-story Classical Revival block, which has the original 1847 two-story Greek Revival house attached as an ell to one side, along with another c. 1840 structure that may have functioned as a separate kitchen.  The property was first developed by the Peyton family, with its present buildings dating to the ownership of the Rogers family.  During the American Civil War, Oakham was where the irregular Confederate Army unit known as Mosby's Rangers was organized.

The farm was listed on the National Register of Historic Places in 2016.

See also
National Register of Historic Places listings in Loudoun County, Virginia

References

Houses on the National Register of Historic Places in Virginia
National Register of Historic Places in Loudoun County, Virginia
Houses completed in 1847
Houses in Loudoun County, Virginia
1847 establishments in Virginia